Ahmed Fatehi (Arabic: أحمد فتحي) (born 25 January 1993) is a Qatari footballer. He currently plays for Al-Arabi. He is of Egyptian descent through his father.

References

External links

Qatari footballers
Qatari people of Egyptian descent
1993 births
Living people
Al-Arabi SC (Qatar) players
Naturalised citizens of Qatar
Qatar Stars League players
2019 AFC Asian Cup players
Association football midfielders
AFC Asian Cup-winning players
Qatar international footballers